Filipovići  may refer to:

 Filipovići, Foča, a village in Bosnia and Herzegovina
 Filipovići (Loznica), a village in Serbia
 Filipovići, Croatia, a village near Sveti Ivan Zelina

See also
 Filipović